Louis Henri Jean Caspers (2 October 1825, Paris – 1906, Paris) was a French pianist and composer.

A student at the Conservatoire de Paris, he composed the music for several shows performed among others on the stages of the Théâtre des Bouffes-Parisiens and the Théâtre Lyrique. He abandoned composition in 1861 to take care of business and did not return before 1892.

Works 
1842: Hommage à la mémoire de S. A. R. M S.r Le Duc d'Orléans, melody, lyrics by Jules Barbier
1848: Prière à la nuit, adagio cantabile for piano
1851: Les Cloches du soir, melody, poems by Marceline Desbordes-Valmore
1851: Dors-tu Marie ?, melody, lyrics by Charles Dubois de Gennes
1851: Fantaisies, valses for piano
1856: Le Chapeau du roi, one-act opéra comique, libretto by Édouard Fournier
1859: Dans la rue, pochade musicale en un acte, libretto by Charles Henri Ladislas Laurençot
1859: La Charmeuse, opéra-comique, libretto by d'Édouard Fournier
1859: Les Pêcheurs, four-voice choir
1860: Ma Tante dort, opéra comique, libretto by Hector Crémieux
1861: Au rendez-vous !, song, lyrics by Charles Lamartinière
1892: Blanc et noir, dance for piano
1892: Stella, valse for piano

Bibliography 
 François Joseph Fétis, François Auguste Arthur P. Pougin, Biographie universelle des musiciens, 1878, p. 159
 John Denison Champlin, William Foster Apthorp, Cyclopedia of Music and Musicians, vol.1, 1888, p. 281
 Albert Ernest Wier, The Macmillan Encyclopedia of Music and Musicians, 1938, p. 300 
 Florian Bruyas, Histoire de l'opérette en France, 1855-1965, 1974, p. 55
 T. J. Walsh, Second Empire Opera: The Théâtre Lyrique, Paris 1851-1870, 1981, p. 72, 115, 186
 Robert Ignatius Letellier, The Diaries of Giacomo Meyerbeer: 1791-1839, 1999, p. 111

References

External links 

19th-century French male classical pianists
French operetta composers
Conservatoire de Paris alumni
1825 births
Musicians from Paris
1906 deaths
French male classical composers